The Cologne Mark was a unit of weight (or mass) equivalent to 233.856 grams (about  3,609 grains). The Cologne mark was in use from the 11th century onward.

The Mark was defined as half a Cologne Pfund (pound). A Pfund was divided into 16 Unzen (ounces) of 29.23 grams, (about 451 grains). Each Unze was subdivided into 2 Lot, 8 Quentchen, and 32 Pfennig. This ounce was the basis of several other pounds, including in England the Tower pound (12 ounces), the Merchant's pound (15 ounces), and the London pound (16 ounces).

The Cologne pfund (2 marks) should not be confused with the pfund of around 350 grams, 5400 grains, used in the Nuremberg apothecaries' system (Apothekergewicht), and was approximately equal to the old Tower pound (1 marks). This pfund had 12 unzen, each of which contained 36 Gran, with the Gran equal to 0.812 grams (about 12.53 grains).

See also
Reichsmünzordnung

References

External links
 Eighteenth Century Weights

History of Cologne
Coins of the Holy Roman Empire
Units of measurement of the Holy Roman Empire

de:Mark (Gewicht)#Kölner Mark